The list of winners of the Nandi Award for Best Educational Film since 1981:

See also
Nandi Awards

References

Nandi Awards